The Hoofdklasse is the second level women's futsal league in the Netherlands, organized by the Royal Dutch Football Association. The competition, which is played under UEFA rules, currently consists of 76 teams.

References 

Futsal competitions in the Netherlands
Women's futsal leagues
Women's sport in the Netherlands